The National Archives at Seattle is a regional facility of the U.S. National Archives and Records Administration Pacific Region located in Seattle, Washington. The archives building is situated in the Windermere neighborhood of Northeast Seattle, near Magnuson Park, and holds  of documents and artifacts.

The archives opened in 1951 and moved to a permanent facility in 1963 at a renovated Navy warehouse. In 2020, the federal government approved plans to close the Seattle branch and sell the property, sparking backlash from local historians and public officials.

Facility

The National Archives at Seattle are housed in a building on Sand Point Way in the Windermere neighborhood of northeastern Seattle, near Magnuson Park and the Burke-Gilman Trail. The building is described as "drab" and "warehouse-like", and is located on a  campus with parking and a perimeter fence. The public access research room has seven computers and several microfilm readers. , the Seattle facility had 40 employees and 40 volunteer assistants.

Holdings

, the Seattle facility has  of permanent records, including documents and artifacts from the U.S. states of Alaska, Idaho, Oregon, and Washington. The records date from the 1850s to the 1980s and include treaty documents from the region's 272 federally recognized Native American tribes, as well as unrecognized groups. The collections are organized into 110 record groups based on the federal agency or system that authored them.

History

The General Services Administration opened a records center at the Sand Point Naval Air Station in 1951, serving as Seattle's branch of the National Archives. The Seattle branch was upgraded to a federal records center in August 1953 and moved five times prior to the establishment of the permanent facility. The new facility near Sand Point was located in a  Navy warehouse that was built in 1949 and underwent extensive renovations that cost $397,000. It was dedicated as the Federal Archives and Records Center on November 16, 1963, in a ceremony that included speeches from Governor Albert D. Rosellini and U.S. senators Henry M. Jackson and Warren G. Magnuson, who praised the facility as "one of the finest centers in the nation". A portion of the collections was destroyed in a fire in 1974.

The Seattle branch began receiving national microfilm records in 1970, beginning with the minutes of the Continental Congress. The arrival of U.S. Census records in 1974 caused public use of the facility to increase from 25 people per day to over 2,500, credited to the interest in genealogy spurred by the Bicentennial celebration. The facility's Montana records were transferred to the Denver Archives in 1976, and the Alaska records were moved to a new facility in Anchorage, Alaska, that opened on July 11, 1990. The National Archives and Records Administration announced its closure of the Anchorage facility in 2014 and the records were transferred back to Seattle.

Proposed closure

The Public Buildings Reform Board (part of the Office of Management and Budget) recommended the closure of the Seattle facility in late 2019. The recommendation report, submitted in December 2019, identified the  campus as highly valuable for sale and redevelopment. The recommendation was not subject to public hearings or advance notice, with only a briefing for the office of U.S. representative Pramila Jayapal in October.  The site was one of only fourteen Federal properties nationwide recommended for disposal by the PBRB; the other Washington state site recommended was the General Services Administration's Auburn Complex. The recommended archives closure was approved by the federal government in January 2020, with plans to relocate records to storage facilities in Riverside, California, and Kansas City, Missouri, over an 18-month period.

The planned closure and relocation of records drew criticism from historians, archivists, and public officials in the Pacific Northwest and Alaska. The U.S. senators from Washington, Oregon, Idaho, and Alaska signed a letter to the Office of Management and Budget opposing the closure. The editorial boards of The Seattle Times and the Anchorage Daily News also published articles condemning the proposal. An on-site protest was held by indigenous rights activists on February 11, 2020, while tribal leaders from the Pacific Northwest met with officials from the National Archives and Records Administration. Washington Attorney General Bob Ferguson announced plans to review the closure for possible litigation under the Administrative Procedure Act, which requires public disclosure of the rationale for certain federal actions, or Executive Order 13175, which requires consultation with tribal officials for relevant federal decisions.

The facility was temporarily closed to the public on March 23, 2020, due to the COVID-19 pandemic. The planned full closure was challenged by Ferguson in a set of Freedom of Information Act lawsuits filed against NARA, the Office of Management and Budget, and the General Services Administration. In January 2021, the state governments of Washington and Oregon, joined by 28 tribes, filed a lawsuit against the federal government to halt the facility's closure following a notice from NARA that it intended to accelerate the sale process. On February 12, a preliminary injunction to block the sale was granted by U.S. District Court Judge John Coughenour. The Office of Management and Budget withdrew their approval of the facility's closure on April 8, citing the Biden administration's policy on tribal consultation. NARA announced that they would find a solution for the long-term storage of the records, stating that their "longstanding concerns with the building conditions" were not resolved with the decision.

References

External links

Buildings and structures in Seattle
National Archives and Records Administration